University of Tehran Press (UTP) is a publishing house and a department of the University of Tehran in Iran founded in 1957. It is the largest university press in the Middle East.

The press has published more than 5,000 titles in Persian language, and is currently publishing an average of one book per day.

References

External links
 Official website

Press
Tehran
University presses of Iran
Mass media in Tehran
Publishing companies established in 1958